The 1893 Furman Baptists football team represented Furman University as an independent during the 1893 college football season. Led by third-year head coach H. P. Young, Furman compiled a record of 1–1.

Schedule

References

Furman
Furman Paladins football seasons
Furman Baptists football